Morgana O'Reilly (born 19 August 1985) is a New Zealand film, television and theatre actress. She has appeared in several theatre productions and created the one-woman play The Height of the Eiffel Tower, which she performed at the Edinburgh Festival Fringe in 2014. O'Reilly played Lynn Matthews in the biographical television film Billy and starred as Kylie Bucknell in the horror-comedy Housebound. She has made appearances in Nothing Trivial, Sunny Skies, This is Littleton. O'Reilly played Naomi Canning in Neighbours from 2013 until 2015. She made a guest appearance in 2020. She stars in sitcom Mean Mums and joined the cast of Wentworth as Narelle Stang in 2019.

Early life
Morgana Le Fay Naomi Jane O'Reilly was born in New Zealand to Mary-Jane, a dancer and choreographer, and Phil O'Reilly, a graphic designer. She grew up in the Ponsonby/Grey Lynn area. O'Reilly said she got her love of performing from her mother and that she wanted to be an actor since she was 15. O'Reilly attended Unitec Institute of Technology and graduated in 2006.

Career
After graduating from Unitec, O'Reilly appeared in several theatre productions, including Three Sisters, Marat/Sade and Coram Boy. She also undertook some bar work at The Basement Theatre in Auckland. After a stint in the comedy show A Thousand Apologies, O'Reilly was cast in a new production of Toa Fraser's play Bare. The director, Oliver Driver, said O'Reilly was cast because of her ability to play several different characters.

In 2009, O'Reilly created a one-woman play called The Height of the Eiffel Tower. The play focuses on Terri Hulme, a mother of four, who takes a closer look at her life when she goes on a coffee date with an old university friend. O'Reilly approached her friend Abigail Greenwood to direct and act as dramaturge. Her mother Mary-Jane O'Reilly danced a solo piece on stage for the first time in years, before O'Reilly premiered The Height of the Eiffel Tower. The play was well-received and O'Reilly went on to perform it at the New York Fringe Festival.

After O'Reilly was cast as Amber in Thomas Sainsbury's black comedy Dance Troupe Supreme, she turned to her mother for help researching the role due to her background in dance. In 2011, O'Reilly appeared in the biographical television film Billy, where she played Lynn Matthews, the wife of comedian, musician and actor Billy T. James. She also starred as Desdemona in Jesse Peach's production of Othello and made a guest appearance in the comedy-drama series Nothing Trivial, as lead character Mac's love interest, Alison.

O'Reilly went on to star in the television film Safe House, which aired during TV One's Sunday Night Theatre. She was also cast in TV3's comedy series Sunny Skies as Nicky, an "independent, organised campground owner". On 30 December 2013, it was announced O'Reilly had joined the cast of Neighbours as Naomi Canning. O'Reilly attended two rounds of auditions before she won the role. O'Reilly and her husband filmed her first audition in their garden in Sydney, before O'Reilly flew to Melbourne to audition in the studio, with cast members Colette Mann and Stefan Dennis. She made her first appearance as Naomi on 25 March 2014.

O'Reilly appeared in This is Littleton in February 2014. She also wrote for the series. O'Reilly stars as Kylie Bucknell in Gerard Johnstone's horror-comedy Housebound, which had its world premiere at SXSW. For her performance as Kylie, O'Reilly earned a nomination for Best Actress at the 2014 Rialto Channel New Zealand Film Awards. O'Reilly performed The Height of the Eiffel Tower at the Edinburgh Festival Fringe in August 2014. O'Reilly departed Neighbours in mid-2015 to pursue new acting roles. The following year, she was cast as the female lead, Vanda, in the Auckland Theatre Company's production of Venus in Fur.

In 2017, O'Reilly directed a touring production of family drama deVINE with the RECollective Theatre Company. In August that year, she starred as Stella Kowalski in A Streetcar Named Desire at the Silo Theatre. O'Reilly and Anna Jullienne appeared in the 2018 comedy pilot Mean Mums, which competed against four other sitcoms as part of Three's Comedy Pilot Week. The pilot performed well and MediaWorks New Zealand picked it up to series. In 2019, O'Reilly joined the cast of Wentworth, playing the role of "volatile" prisoner Narelle Stang. The following year, she returned to Neighbours for a guest stint, and appeared in mystery drama series The Sounds. O'Reilly also starred in comedy-thriller INSiDE, created with her husband Peter Salmon during New Zealand's COVID-19 lockdown. The series was filmed in the couple's house in Auckland.

Personal life
O'Reilly is married to filmmaker Peter Salmon. O'Reilly announced her pregnancy on 6 June 2015, and she gave birth to their daughter on 25 August. O'Reilly gave birth to her second child, a son, in 2018.

Filmography

References

External links

1985 births
Living people
New Zealand television actresses
New Zealand film actresses
21st-century New Zealand actresses
Place of birth missing (living people)
Unitec Institute of Technology alumni